"All About Me" is a song written by Rob Wells and Matthew Martson and recorded by Australian pop singer Hugh Sheridan. The song was released on 30 October 2009 as the lead single from Sheridan's debut studio album, Speak Love.

Music video
The music video was released on 30 October 2009.

Track listing
Digital/CD
 "All About Me" – 3:31

Charts

Release history

References

2009 songs
2009 singles
Sony Music Australia singles
Hugh Sheridan songs